French F4 Championship, formerly known as Formula Renault Campus France, Formula Campus, Formul'Academy Euro Series, F4 Eurocup 1.6 is a form of open wheel racing founded in 1993 by Louis Drouet. It is based in France and aims at karting graduates. The series currently organized by the Fédération Française du Sport Automobile (FFSA). Formerly, the champion receives support to continue in one of the Formula Renault 2.0 championships. In 2010, the re-branded series was made part of the World Series by Renault, but was then dropped for 2011. Since 2018, the series runs under FIA moniker.

The car
The car was originally built by Signatech. The chassis and survival cell had a carbon fibre composite monocoque construction. The car was designed to comply with the 2008 FIA F3 standards. The 1600cc Renault K4MRS engine produced about 140 bhp. The transmission had five forward speeds with sequential shift mechanism.

The championship adopted FIA Formula 4 regulations in 2018, with Mygale M14-F4 chassis and naturally-aspirated 160 bhp Renault 2.0L engines. In 2020, the engine was changed to the new turbo charged Renault Sport 1.3-liter one. For the 2022 season, the new Mygale M21-F4 chassis will be used.

Regulations
 The event schedule usually takes place over three days (normally Friday to Sunday) with free practice sessions on the first day. The qualifying session determines the starting order for first race and the second fastest time the grid for the third race. The grid for the second race is set by reversing the top ten finishers of the first race. All races lasts 20 minutes + 1 lap.
 Tyres allocated to each driver in sets of 4 at each meeting of competition.
 Points are awarded to the first ten finishers of each race in the following order:
Points are awarded as follows:

Champions

Prior French F4 Championship

French F4 Championship

FIA French F4 Championship

Circuits 

From 2011, the circuits used in the French F4 Championship are listed as:

 Bold denotes a circuit will be used in the 2023 season.

Notes

References

External links
 French F4 Championship official website

French F4 Championship
Auto racing series in France
European auto racing series
Renault Sport Series
Recurring sporting events established in 1993